Epidendrum parahybunense  is a species of orchid of the genus Epidendrum. This is an epiphytic orchid occurring in Brazil.

References 

parahybunense
Epiphytic orchids
Endemic orchids of Brazil